Heliaea is a genus of parasitic flies in the family Tachinidae, containing a single species, Heliaea mirabilis.

Distribution
The species is found in Venezuela.

References

Diptera of South America
Endemic fauna of Venezuela
Dexiinae
Taxa named by Charles Howard Curran
Insects described in 1934